Rethusus is a genus of beetles in the family Latridiidae, containing the following species:

 Rethusus fulvescens Broun, 1921
 Rethusus lachrymosus Broun, 1885
 Rethusus pictulus Broun, 1886
 Rethusus pustulosus (Belon, 1884)

References

Latridiidae genera